Bill, the Galactic Hero is a 2014 science fiction student film directed by Alex Cox and six student co-directors based on Harry Harrison's 1965 novel of the same name.

Plot synopsis
Bill is a farm hand who is drugged and shanghaied into the Space Troopers. Bill initially works as a fuse tender but when his ship is struck by enemy fire Bill finds himself the only remaining soldier capable of firing on the enemy Chingers. He destroys an enemy fleet with a lucky shot and is proclaimed a hero. He becomes lost in a labyrinth of bureaucracy, eventually recruiting his own younger brother into military service to the chagrin of his mother.

Cast

 James Miller as Bill
 Devon Wycoff as Deathwish Drang
 Jesse Lee Pacheco as Sixth Class Tembo
 Kaitlin McManus as Bown Brown / Sgt. Ferkel
 Eddy Jordan as X / Pinkteron 
 Hayden Winston as Chaplain / Laundry Officer
 Brittany Handler as 1st Class Spleen
 Nick Wagner as Old Sarge / Corp. DeSalius
 Bradley Allf as Deplanned Outlaw
 Lily Grisafi as Eager Beager
 Pablo Kjolseth as The Emperor 
 Anneka Kumli as Mother / Officer 1
 Susan Sebanc as All Robots (voice)
 Frank Vidana as Surgeon
 Shayn Herndon

Production
Alex Cox had initially optioned the rights to a film version of Harry Harrison's 1965 novel in 1983 as he was completing Repo Man. The project met with studio resistance and remained unmade until 2012 when Alex Cox had begun teaching film production at the University of Colorado at Boulder. He had the idea to have his students film an adaptation of the novel and suggested the idea to Harrison, who granted Cox an academic license to produce a student film and was working with Cox on the screenplay for the film at the time of his death in 2012. In March 2013, Cox launched a Kickstarter campaign, hoping to raise $100,000 to shoot the film. The campaign exceeded the goal and raised $114,957 from 1,106 backers. Cox also succeeded in getting numerous film professionals to work on a royalties basis. The film went into production in October. Scenes were shot in university buildings. Iggy Pop, who wrote and performed the song "Repo Man" for Alex Cox's 1984 film, also wrote and performed the theme song for Bill, the Galactic Hero.

Release
The film premiered in Boulder, Colorado on December 12, 2014. It gained positive reviews. It was later shown on New Year's Eve at the Clinton Street Theater.

References

External links
 

2014 films
American science fiction films
American films with live action and animation
2010s science fiction films
2010s English-language films
Films directed by Alex Cox
Films set in the future
Films based on American novels
Films based on science fiction novels
Kickstarter-funded films
Films shot in Colorado
2010s war films
American student films
University of Colorado Boulder
2010s American films